The 1988 National Soccer League season was the sixty-fifth season under the National Soccer League (NSL) name. The season began on May 10, 1988, and concluded on September 14, 1988, with Toronto Italia winning the NSL Championship by finishing first in the First Division. Toronto would also secure a double by defeating Montreal Superga of the Quebec National Soccer League (LNSQ) for the NSL Canadian Championship. The NSL Ontario Cup was won by Toronto Croatia on September 17, 1988. Croatia would face St. Leonard-Corfinium of the LNSQ for the NSL Canada Cup but was defeated by a score of 3-1. St. Catharines Roma II was the reserve division champions.

Overview 
Significant reforms were unanimously approved by the board of directors at the annual general meeting on January 23, 1988. Changes included an increase in club membership due to the return of a reserve division, which required each member to field a reserve team. The newly formed division would serve as a developmental platform for younger players and provide the senior teams with a larger resource of talent. The league's playing format was revised with the elimination of the postseason system with the winner of the regular season determining the overall champion. The First Division retained the majority of members from the previous season except for Nacional Latino and Toronto International. 

The league organized a friendly tournament named the Friendship Cup which involved Toronto Croatia, Toronto Italia, and Windsor Wheels in a series of matches against Cosenza and Palermo F.C. of Italy. Toronto Italia would defeat Cosenza in the finals to win the tournament title. The league continued its collaboration with the Quebec National Soccer League (LNSQ) to form a national championship by providing their league and league cup winners to crown a national champion.

Teams

Final standings

Cup  
The cup tournament was a separate contest from the rest of the season, in which all ten teams took part. All the matches were separate from the regular season, and the teams were grouped into two separate divisions. The two winners in the group stage would advance to a singles match for the Cup. The winner of the league cup would face the Quebec National Soccer League (LNSQ) cup titleholder for the NSL Canada Cup.

Finals

NSL Canadian Championship 
Since the 1986 season, a joint effort was conducted between the Pacific Rim Soccer League of British Columbia, National Soccer League and the Quebec National Soccer League to provide a national champion. Their regional champions would face each other in a singles match for the championship. The Pacific Rim Soccer League participated in the first tournament but ceased operations in 1987. While their league cup champions would compete for the NSL Canada Cup. Toronto Italia would win the championship by defeating Montreal Superga of the Quebec National Soccer League (LNSQ).

References

External links
RSSSF CNSL page
thecnsl.com - 1988 season

 
1988–89 domestic association football leagues
National Soccer League
1988